The village Szabolcs lies in the county Szabolcs-Szatmár-Bereg in the north-east of Hungary.

It got its name from the Hungarian leader Szabolcs who founded it and settled there in the 9th/10th century. According to Anonymus in the Gesta Hungarorum:
"he saw a place on the shore of the Tisza, and as he saw how [good/strong] it was, [so] he came to the conclusion, that by its strength, it must have been created for building a castle there. Rallying there common folk, he ordered to dig a big moat and ordered to build a quite strong castle of earth. This is now called Castle of Szabolcs". 

Either the leader, or the place, which once being the residence of the leader was the center of
the region, gave the name to the historical county Szabolcs (which was united later with parts of other counties to Szabolcs-Szatmár-Bereg.

Notes
 translation to English by Wikipedia user "Szabi" from Hungarian  "megtekintett egy helyet a Tisza mellett, s midőn látta, milyen is az, kiokoskodta, hogy erősségénél fogva várépítésre való. Összegyűjtve ott a köznépet, nagy árkot ásatott, és igen erős várat építtetett földből. Ezt most Szabolcs várának hívják.", which is a translation from the Latin text in Gesta Hungarorum. This is not a direct translation from Latin, but a translation-from-a-translation, therefore please, take it with a pinch of salt.

Populated places in Szabolcs-Szatmár-Bereg County